is a Japanese vovinam athlete from Tokyo. She won a bronze medal in dragon-tiger form event at the 2016 Asian Beach Games held in Danang, Vietnam and became the first ever Japanese to win a medal at vovinam.

References

Living people
Japanese martial artists
Year of birth missing (living people)